Raúl Talán (28 February 1907 – April 1992) was a Mexican boxer. He competed in the men's featherweight event at the 1928 Summer Olympics. At the 1928 Summer Olympics, he lost to Kaarlo Väkevä of Finland.

References

1907 births
1992 deaths
Mexican male boxers
Olympic boxers of Mexico
Boxers at the 1928 Summer Olympics
People from Cananea
Featherweight boxers
Boxers from Sonora